The Taqiyah (ALA-LC: ṭāqīyah), also known as tagiyah or araqchin is a short, rounded skullcap. It is often worn for cultural or religious purposes; for example, some Muslims believe that the Islamic prophet Muhammad used to keep his head covered, therefore making it mustahabb (i.e., it is commendable to cover the head in order to emulate him). Muslim men often wear them during the daily prayers.

When worn by itself, the taqiyah can be any color. However, particularly in Arab countries, when worn under the keffiyeh headscarf, they are kept in a traditional white. Some Muslims wrap a turban around the cap, called an ʿimamah in Arabic, which is often done by Shia and Sunni Muslims. In the United States and Britain, taqiyas are usually referred to as "kufis".

Topi is a type of taqiyah cap that is worn in Pakistan, Bangladesh, India, and other regions of South Asia. Many different types of topi caps include the Sindhi cap, worn in Sindh and the crochet topi that is often worn at Muslim prayer services (see salat).

The topi cap is often worn with shalwar kameez, which is the national costume of Pakistan.

Etymology
Taqiyah is the Arabic word for a Muslim skullcap. In the Indian subcontinent, it is called a topi which means hat or cap in general. In Pakistan, India, and Bangladesh, men usually wear the topi with kurta and paijama. In the United States and Britain, many Muslim merchants sell the prayer cap under the name kufi. Sephardic Jews adopted the Bukharan from the Kufi (See Bukharan).

Muslim world
There are a wide variety of Muslim caps worn around the world. Each country or region usually has a unique head covering.

Countries

Afghanistan
In Afghanistan men wear all sorts of "araqchins" with different designs depending on their ethnicity, village and affiliations. They often wrap a turban around it, which is most of the time white, but black and other colors are also widely seen. They wear their araqchins with a "Peran Tomban" or "Perahan wa Tonban" which means shirt and trouser in the Persian of Afghanistan, which corresponds to a different version of the Shalwar Kameez, it's more archaic, which is probably the origin of the Shalwar Kameez. It's collarless, and traditionally the shirt and the trouser is wider than the Shalwar Kameez. Traditionally the shirts spots golden embroidery or specific embroidery. But due to war, the traditional Peran Tomban is less and less used, and the Shalwar Kameez with a collar is becoming more and more used, specially by Eastern Afghans, and people coming from poor backgrounds.

Indonesia
The peci/songkok is the national dress.  The Indonesians also produce a machine knitted skullcap that is popular with Muslims.  Javanese people wear the sarong with their caps. In Sundanese, the skullcap is called a kupluk.

Maldives
The prayer cap is called thakiha. The cap is known as the thofi and the fishermen cap is referred to as koari.

Bangladesh

The prayer cap in Bangladesh is known as a "ṭupi" from the Prakrit term "ṭopiā" meaning helmet. In the Chittagong Division and Sylhet Division, it is known as the "toki" from the Arabic term "طاقية". Tupis made in Comilla and Nilphamari are exported to the Middle East.

Malaysia
Men wear the songkok. Traditional Malaysian men's attire consists of a shirt, matching pants, and waist wrap that is called a Baju melayu.  For informal events, and prayers at the mosque, the sarong is worn. However, a person seen wearing a songkok in Malaysia, especially in a Dewan Undangan Negeri, is not necessarily a Muslim. This is because non-Muslims are required to wear one to comply with the dressing code of the assembly. Taqiyah is known as kopiah in Malaysia.

Pakistan

The prayer cap is called a topi, see Topi cap.  Pakistani men wear a variety of other caps including the Sindhi topi, a mirrored cap with a front opening that allows the wearer to place the forehead on the ground during prayer, see Sindhi cap.  Other caps include the karakul (hat), fez (hat) and pakol.

Russia
Muslim men wear the tubeteika.  In Russia, the tubeteika is worn with a suit for Eid ul Fitr or Jumu'ah, and a tuxedo for wedding ceremonies.  Russian Muslims also wear the doppa or rug cap.  In Russia, giving a rug cap to a person as a gift is a sign of friendship.  The Russian name for the doppa is tubeteika.  In Russia, the folk costume consists of a kosovorotka for men and a sarafan for women.  Among Turkic peoples, traditional Turkic costumes are worn.  Russian Muslims wear a variety of fur hats including the karakul (hat), which is called an astrakhan hat in Russia, the ushanka, and the papakhi, see Islam in Russia.  A Russian diplomat hat, which is a boat shaped  cossack hat, is also worn. Nikita Khrushchev is said to have popularized it.

Somalia

Men in Somalia often wear the koofiyad cotton prayer cap, along with a sarong referred to as a macawiis. The jalabiya is also sometimes worn.

Sudan
The prayer cap is worn under a white turban called an imama. Sudanese men wear the white turban with a white thobe called a jalabiyyah, see Islam in Sudan and Culture of Sudan. In the United States, the Sudanese robe is sold as an African dishdasha, Sudani or Sudanese thobe.

Turkey
Before 1925, men used to wear the fez hat and calpack, or a conical taqiyah known as the taj. However, the hat law of 1925 formally banned these form of hats. The Turkish cap, which is similar to a beanie or tuque, can also commonly be found. The Turkish cap is made of wool or cotton fleece and has a distinctive pom-pom or toorie on top. Turkish people also wear regular cotton prayer caps. Women wear a variety of folk dresses with a vest called a jelick and a veil called a yashmak. The traditional wedding dress is red. Men wear the folk costume to festivals and prayers, but most men don a suit or tuxedo for weddings. Additionally, Dervishes have a unique costume.

Turkmenistan
In Turkmenistan taqiyahs is an indispensable item of the national male garment, often worn on daily basis, along with another traditional headgear - telpek (Turkmen sheepskin hat).

United Arab Emirates
Men in the UAE often wear the Gahfiyyah cotton prayer cap.  Emirati  men wear the white Ghutra on top of a Gahfiyyah Cap with a white thobe called a Kandoura or Kandoora.  In an effort to strengthen religious awareness for foreign visitors, Sheik Mohammed Bin Rashid Al Makthoum the crown prince of Dubai has, from 2012 onwards, requested that all visiting westerners and non-Muslims adhere to Islamic dress code during religious festivals. If full adherence is impossible a simple Gahfiyyah worn during prayers will suffice.

Regions

Central Asia

The doppa is most common. In the United States, the doppa is sold as an Uzbek kufi,  Bukharan kippah, Bucharian or  Bokharan yarmulke (Bukharian Jews of Central Asia also wore headcoverings similar to the Doppi/Tubeteika design but wore it for religious reasons pertaining to Judaism). The doppa is also called the rug cap because the needlework is the same as that found on Uzbek oriental rugs, see Uzbek people. In Central Asia, men wear the doppa with a suit. Uzbeks also wear the tubeteika, which they call a duppi. The traditional tubeteika is a black velvet cap with white or silver embroidery. For festivals, a folk costume is worn that consists of a robe called a khalat. The khalat is often worn with a coat called a chapan. Tajiks wear the rug cap and the tubeteika. In Canada, Neil Peart, the drummer for Rush, wore a tubeteika. Also, followers of the Naqshbandi Haqqani Sufi Order wear Uzbek Kufis as Bahauddin Naqshband was from Uzbekistan and it is seen as a friendlier alternative to the austere solid black and white of some Muslims.

Balkans 
The Bosniaks wear the cotton prayer cap, the black beret, and the fez hat, see Islam in Bosnia and Herzegovina.  During Eid ul Fitr, the prayer cap is worn with a suit.  For wedding ceremonies, a tuxedo is worn.

Africa
The fez hat, the tarboush or chechia is worn.  In Morocco, men wear the djellaba with their fez hats.  The short sleeved robe is the gandora.  In Arabia, the galabeya is worn.

In East Africa, the kofia is commonly worn in the Muslim communities in the coastal areas of Kenya, Tanzania, and Uganda. Some Swahili speaking populations that are Muslim wear the kofia with a white robe called a kanzu in the Swahili language. In the United States, the kanzu is sold as an Omani thobe, Emirati thobe, or Yemeni dishdasha. A white kanzu and suit jacket or blazer is the formal wear of Swahili peoples.

In West Africa, there is the kufi hat, or alasho/tagelmust turban, which is worn with the grand boubou for all official functions, weddings, and Islamic celebrations. Another West African robe is called a Senegalese kaftan which is similar to an Arabic thobe, but with a different tailored cut, and the kufi or fez is often worn with it. As in Morocco, the gandora and djellaba is also worn by West African men, especially in domestic settings or for in-home prayers.

The traditional women's attire is the wrapper, with hijab (worn as a turban or turban with additional scarf covering the sides of the head.

See also
 Dhaka topi
 Plis
 Fez (headdress worn in the Middle East and Balkans)
 Islamic clothing
 Kalimavkion
 Keffiyeh (headdress worn in the Middle East)
 Kippah (skullcap worn by Jews)
 Klobuk
 Kufi (cap worn by male in Africa)
 List of hats
 Pakol
 Religious clothing
 Sindhi cap
 Skufia
 Tubeteika (cap worn in Central Asia)
 Zucchetto (skullcap worn by clerics of Catholic churches)

Notes

Explanatory notes

Citations

External links

 Arab caps and hats
 Turkish costumes
  Topi and taqiyah cap photos

Afghan clothing
Algerian clothing
Arabic clothing
Bangladeshi clothing
Caps
Indian headgear
Islamic male clothing
Middle Eastern clothing
Non-clerical religious clothing
Pakistani headgear
Ottoman clothing